Daghdaghan (also Romanized as Daghdaghān; also known as Tokhtugan, Tūkhī Tūqān, and Tykhtugan) is a village in Mavazekhan-e Shomali Rural District, Khvajeh District, Heris County, East Azerbaijan Province, Iran. At the 2006 census, its population was 162, in 43 families.

References 

Populated places in Heris County